Hangtou is a town in Pudong, Shanghai, China. , it administers the following 28 residential neighborhoods and 13 villages:
Neighborhoods
Hangtou
Xiasha
Ruiheyuan
Heming
Changda
Jinsehangcheng
Dongshengjiayuan
Haizhoutaohuayuan
Chenxiang
Nanxinjiayuan
Hengfujiayuan
Yulijiayuan
Ruipujiayuan
Hangwujiayuan
Juhangyuan
Changtaidongjiao
Huikangjinyuan
Yuxingjiayuan
Jinqinyuan First
Jinqinyuan Second
Dongmingyuan
Huichengjiayuan
Hemeiyuan
Huishanjiayuan
Huirenxinyuan
Ruixinyuan
Jindiyihuanian
Ruixiangyuan

Villages
Haiqiao Village
Heming Village
Changda Village
Guoyuan Village
Fushan Village
Chenxiang Village
Hedong Village
Shenzhuang Village
Wanglou Village
Meiyuan Village
Pailou Village
Hangdong Village
Fengqiao Village

References

Towns in Shanghai
Pudong